Maciej Czyżowicz (born 28 January 1962) was a Polish former modern pentathlete. He competed at the 1988 Summer Olympics, at the 1992 Summer Olympics, and at the 1996 Summer Olympics. He won a gold medal in the team event in 1992.

References

1962 births
Living people
Polish male modern pentathletes
Olympic modern pentathletes of Poland
Modern pentathletes at the 1988 Summer Olympics
Modern pentathletes at the 1992 Summer Olympics
Modern pentathletes at the 1996 Summer Olympics
Olympic gold medalists for Poland
Olympic medalists in modern pentathlon
Sportspeople from Szczecin
Medalists at the 1992 Summer Olympics